Vitellidelos dulcis is a species of small, air-breathing, carnivorous land snail, a terrestrial pulmonate gastropod mollusc in the family Rhytididae. This species is found in Australia.

References

Rhytididae
Gastropods described in 1943